Reed Philip Vertelney is an American record producer, songwriter, composer, and multi-instrumentalist from Calabasas, CA. He has written, produced, played, and worked for and with artists such as Michael Jackson, Luther Vandross, Marcus Miller, Charlie Wilson, Kenny Lattimore, Evelyn "Champagne" King, Marc Anthony, Destiny's Child/Beyoncé, Natalie Grant, Jason Mraz, Clay Aiken, Elliott Yamin, 98 Degrees, Smokey Robinson, Gladys Knight, and many more, as well as companies such as Walt Disney Records (Lemonade Mouth). He studied at the Berklee College of Music and shares two Grammy nominations with Luther Vandross in 1997 for "Your Secret Love" (Best R&B Song) and in 1994 for "Heaven Knows" (Best R&B Song (Songwriter)).

References 

Living people
Record producers from California
African-American record producers
African-American male songwriters
21st-century American composers
20th-century American composers
African-American composers
20th-century multi-instrumentalists
21st-century multi-instrumentalists
People from Calabasas, California
Luther Vandross

African-American male composers
Berklee College of Music alumni
Year of birth missing (living people)